Elections to Barnsley Metropolitan Borough Council were held on 4 May 1978. One third of the council was up for election. The election resulted in Labour retaining control of the council. The sole Democratic Labour councillor elected in 1973 successfully defended his seat as an Independent and the only Independent elected in 1973 unsuccessfully defended his seat as a Conservative.

Election result

This resulted in the following composition of the council:

Ward results

+/- figures represent changes from the last time these wards were contested.

References

1978 English local elections
1978
1970s in South Yorkshire